The following is a partial production discography of Adam "Frank Dukes" Feeney. Since 2022, he has released his own music under the moniker Ging. Active since the early 2000s, Dukes has produced hip hop, pop, jazz, and soul tracks for both independent and major artists and has most often produced for artists Camila Cabello, Post Malone, Drake, Travis Scott, and The Weeknd, having produced more than ten tracks for each of them. During the first half of the 2010s, he produced more than two dozen tracks for members of Wu-Tang Clan and for BADBADNOTGOOD.

An asterisk (*) denotes a track released as a commercial single.

Original music as Ging

Albums 

 We're Here, My Dear (2022)

Singles

Original music as Frank Dukes

Beat tapes

Kingsway Music Library 
As creator of the Kingsway Music sample library, Dukes has curated over 40 volumes of music.

Since 2013, he has composed the following volumes of original music (credits adapted from The Drum Broker),

 Kingsway Music Library, Vol. 1 (2013)
 Kingsway Music Library, Vol. 2 (2013)
 Kingsway Music Library, Vol. 3 (2014)
 Kingsway Music Library, Vol. 4 (2014)
 Kingsway Music Library, Vol. 5 (2015)
 Kingsway Music Library, Vol. 6 (2015)
 Kingsway Music Library, Vol. 7 (2015)
 Kingsway Music Library – Colors (2017) (released as LP)
 Kingsway Music Library, Vol. 8 (2018)
 Kingsway Music Library, Frank Dukes X Allen Ritter (2018)
 Kingsway Music Library, Vol. 9 (2018)
 Kingsway Music Library, Vol. 10 (2019)
 Kingsway Music Library – Parkscapes (2019)
 Kingsway Music Library, Frank Dukes Archive Vol. 1 & Vol. 2 (2021)

Albums produced

Charting singles

Other charted songs

2000s 
This list is incomplete.

Bless – The Book of Bless (2005)

 05. "Somethin' Missing"
Custom Made – Street Cinema Vol. 3: The Blackboard Jungle (2006)

 11. M.I.Aneek*
Radio B – The Difference (2006)

 08. "Interlude #1"
 13. "Interlude #2"
 17. "Outro"

Various artists – Hype Sessions Vol. 12 (2006)

 02. Rap 101 (performed by Tumi and the Volume)
Drake – Room for Improvement (2006)

 05. "Money" (Remix) (featuring Nickelus F)

Joell Ortiz – The Brick: Bodega Chronicles (2007)

 05. "125 Part 2 (Fresh Air)"
 08. "125 Part 3 (Connections)" (featuring Ras Kass, Sha Stimuli, Grafh & Gab Gacha)
 15. "125 Part 4 (Finale)"
Nickelus F – How to Build Buzz for Dummies (2007)

 08. Wrong Doing (feat. Loaded Lux)

Rugged Intellect – Renaissance Music: The Introduction (2007)

 02. "What It Is"
Kool G Rapp – Half a Klip (2008)

 05. "Typical Nigga"

50 Cent – War Angel LP (2009)

 02. "Talking in Codes"

50 Cent – Forever King (2009)

 02. "Respect It or Check It"

50 Cent – "Tia Told Me" single (2009)

 00. "Tia Told Me"
Elzhi – The Leftovers (Unmixedtape) (2009)

 02. "Deep" (additional production)

Joell Ortiz – various singles (2009)

 00. "We Can Do It" (feat. Styles P)
 00. "Line Em Up" (feat. Cory Gunz)

Masta Ace & Edo G – Arts and Entertainment (2009)

 15. "Ei8ht is Enuff" (featuring Ed O.G.)
Ro Spit –The Oh S#!t Project (2009)

 16. "Arts & Crafts" (feat. Fes Roc & Illite)

2010 
AZ – Doe Or Die 15th Anniversary

 02. "Feel My Pain"
Danny Brown – The Hybrid
 08. "Shootin Moves"
Ghostface Killah – Apollo Kids
 01. "Purified Thoughts" (featuring Killah Priest & GZA)
 03. "Black Tequila" (featuring Cappadonna & Trife Diesel)
 07. "In Tha Park" (featuring Black Thought)
Joell Ortiz – Farewell Summer EP

 01. "Intro"
 05. "So Wrong"
Jojo Pellegrino – various singles

 00. "Triple Homicide" feat. Sean Price & Inspectah Deck (2010)
 00. "Devastate" (2010)

Oktober Zero – The Devil Smokes Dimebags

 14. “Spoke To Da O.G.”

Lloyd Banks – H.F.M. The Hunger For More 2
 13. "Sooner Or Later (Die 1 Day)" (featuring Raekwon)
00. "Reach Out" (released as part of Blue Fridays series)
REKS – In Between the Lines, Volume 2.

 17. "Getting Ugly"

Remedy – It All Comes Down To This

 15. "All A Dream"

2011 
AWAR – Thing Of That Nature EP / Nature of the Beast

 01–02. "My Story" (feat. Mic King)
 02–09. "I Don't Care"

D-Black – Mr. October Returns

 11. "Don't Love Me"

Danny Brown – XXX

 01. "XXX"
 13. "DNA"
Eloquor – Human Condition (2011)

 06. "Mr Personality"

J. Pinder – Code Red 2.0

 13. "Upside Down 2.0"*

Joell Ortiz – Free Agent
 01. "Intro"
 13. "Checkin For You" (performed by Sebastian Rios)
Jojo Pellegrino – various singles

 00. "Real Spit" (2011)
 00. Capitano Flow (2011)

Joyner Lucas (as Future Joyner) – Listen to Me

 07. "One"

LEP Bogus Boys – Now or Neva

 15. "Closer" (featuring Dion Primo)
 18. "Outro"
LEP Bogus Boys & Mobb Deep – "Gangstaz Only" single

 00. "Gangstaz Only"

Tony Yayo – Gunpower Guru 3

 "Based" (feat. Lil B)

Various artists – The New North

 06. "Flawless" (performed by Shad)
Various artists – Newermind (SPIN Tribute to Nirvana's Nevermind)

 10. "Stay Away" (performed by Charles Bradley & the Menahan Street Band) (later included on 2018's Black Velvet)

Willie the Kid – The Cure 2

 07. "Fucking In a Foreign Car / Interlude Two"

2012 
Derek Minor – PSA Vol. 3: Who is Derek Minor? (2012)

 11. "Get Up"

Kid Ink & Kirko Bangz – "Take It Down" single
 00. "Take It Down" (sample producer; uncredited)
Ryan Leslie – Les Is More

 12. "The Black Flag"

The Rhyme Animal (SARS Network) – TRA - Blunt Trauma

 01. "Intro"
 06. "No Smiling"

Various artists – The Man with the Iron Fists

 05. "Get Your Way (Sex Is a Weapon)" (performed by Idle Warship)
 06. "Rivers of Blood" (performed by Wu-Tang Clan and Kool G Rap)
 07. "Built for This" (performed by Method Man, Freddie Gibbs and Streetlife)*
 08. "The Archer" (performed by Killa Sin)
 11. "Tick, Tock" (performed by Pusha T, Raekwon, Joell Ortiz and Danny Brown)*
 12. "Green Is The Mountain" (performed by Frances Yip)
 13. "Six Directions of Boxing" (performed by Wu-Tang Clan)
 16. "Bust Shots (Bonus)" (performed by Sheek Louch, Ghostface Killah & Inspectah Deck)
Wu Block (Ghostface Killah & Sheek Louch) – Wu Block
 09. "Different Time Zones" (featuring Inspectah Deck)

2013 
AZ – L.O.D.B II (Last of a Dying Breed)

 23. "Feel Me Pain"
Cashius Green – Right Now

 03. "Get Yo Change"

Charles Bradley – Victim of Love

 01. "Strictly Reserved for You" (featuring Menahan Street Band)* (songwriter credit only)
 08. "Where Do We Go from Here" (featuring Menahan Street Band) (songwriter credit only)

Danny Brown – Old

 19. "Float On" (featuring Charli XCX)
Eminem – The Marshall Mathers LP 2

 19. "Groundhog Day"
Ghetts – Chain Smoking

 03. "Eyes So Low"

OBX – "Mustard" single

 00. "Mustard"

Speaker Knockerz – Finesse Father

 "How Could U" (music by credit)
Tinashe – Black Water

 10. "Stunt" (sample producer)
Tree – Sunday School II: When Church Lets Out
 07. "Busters"

Wu-Tang Clan – Execution in Autumn" single

 01. "Execution in Autumn"*

2014 
50 Cent – Animal Ambition
 01. "Hold On"*
Army Of The Pharaohs – Heavy Lies The Crown

 01. "War Machine"
BadBadNotGood – III

Album executive producer
 01. "Triangle"
 02. "Can't Leave The Night"*
 03. "Confessions" (featuring Leland Whitty)
 04. "Kaleidoscope"
 05. "Eyes Closed"
 06. "Hedron"*
 07. "Differently, Still"
 08. "Since You Asked Kindly"
 09. "CS60"*
 10. "Sustain"*
Drake – "0 to 100 / The Catch Up" single
 01. "0 to 100 / The Catch Up"*
Fabolous – The Young OG Project

 08. "Bish Bounce"

Jeezy – Seen It All: The Autobiography
 04. "Holy Ghost" (sample producer)
Logic – Under Pressure
 07. "Growing Pains III" (sample producer)
 08. "Never Enough" (sample producer)
Schoolboy Q – Oxymoron (Deluxe)
 14. "Grooveline Pt. 2" (featuring Suga Free) (co-producer credit)

Smoke DZA – Dream. ZONE. Achieve (2014)

 09. "Hearses" (feat. Ab-Soul) (sample producer; uncredited)

Wu Block (Ghostface Killah & Sheek Louch) – Hidden Gems

 09. South Beach
Yuna – "Broke Her" single (2014)
 00. "Broke Her" (sample producer; uncredited)

2015 
50 Cent – "9 Shots" single
 00. "9 Shots"*
50 Cent – The Kanan Tape
 07. "On Everything" (sample producer; uncredited)
BADBADNOTGOOD & Ghostface Killah – Sour Soul

Album executive producer

 01. "Mono"
 02. "Soul Soul"
 03. "Six Degrees" (featuring Danny Brown)*
 04. "Gunshowers" (featuring Elzhi)*
 05. "Stark's Reality"
 06. "Tone's Rap"*
 07. "Mind Playing Tricks"
 08. "Street Knowledge" (featuring TREE)
 09. "Ray Gun" (featuring MF DOOM)*
 10. "Nuggets of Wisdom"
 11. "Food"
 12. "Experience"
Big Sean – "What a Year" single

 00. "What a Year" single
Curren$y – Pilot Talk III

 07. "The 560 SL" (featuring Wiz Khalifa)

Curren$y – Stoned on Ocean EP
 03. "Game Tapes" (sample producer; uncredited)
Drake – If You're Reading This It's Too Late
 03. "10 Bands" (songwriting credit only)
 05. "No Tellin'" (co-producer credit)
 17. "6PM In New York" (Bonus Track) (co-producer credit)
Drake – various singles
 00. "Charged Up"
 00. "Right Hand"
Drake & Future – What a Time To Be Alive
 04. "Diamonds Dancing" (sample producer)
Drake & Tinashe – "On a Wave" single
 00. "On a Wave" (sample producer)
Freddie Gibbs – Shadow of a Doubt
 04. "Fuckin' Up the Count"
 13. "Insecurities" (uncredited)
Future – DS2
 12. "Rich Sex"
00. "Hate in Your Soul" demo (sample producer; uncredited)
G-Unit – The Beast Is G Unit
 06. "Choose One" (songwriter credit only)
Gucci Mane – Droptopwop

 06. "Finesse the Plug Interlude" (uncredited)

Jamie Foxx – Hollywood: A Story of a Dozen Roses

 04. "Another Dose"
Jeremih – Late Nights
 01. "Planez" (featuring J. Cole)* (co-producer credit; sample producer)
Joe Budden – All Love Lost (Deluxe)

 13. "Fuck Em All" (uncredited)

Joell Ortiz & !llmind – Human.
 08. "Latino Pt. II" (sample producer)
Joyner Lucas – Along Came Joyner
 17. "Ross Capicchioni"* (sample producer; uncredited)
Logic – "Top Ten" (feat. Big K.R.I.T.) single
 00. "Top Ten" (feat. Big K.R.I.T.) (sample producer; uncredited)
Ludacris – Ludaversal
 04. "Lyrical Healing"
13. "Charge It to the Rap Game" (songwriting credit only)
Lupe Fiasco – Tetsuo & Youth
 "Chopper" (featuring Billy Blue, Buk of Psychodrama, Trouble, Trae tha Truth, Fam-Lay and Glasses Malone) (songwriting credit only)
Mac Miller – GO:OD AM
 08. "Clubhouse" (songwriting credit only)
 11. "Perfect Circle / God Speed"
 13. "ROS" (songwriting credit only)
Pusha T – King Push – Darkest Before The Dawn
 03. "M.F.T.R." (featuring The-Dream)*
Selena Gomez – Revival (Deluxe)
 15. "Outta My Hands (Loco)" (additional producer credit)
Travis Scott – Rodeo
 02. "Oh My Dis Side" (featuring Quavo)
 04. "Wasted" (featuring Juicy J) (additional producer credit)
 06. "Pray 4 Love" (featuring The Weeknd) (songwriting credit only)
 11. "Maria I'm Drunk" (featuring Justin Bieber & Young Thug)
Travis Scott – "Nothing But Net" single

 01. "Nothing But Net" (featuring PartyNextDoor & Young Thug)

Various artists – Southpaw (Music From And Inspired By The Motion Picture)

 10. "Drama Never Ends " (performed by 50 Cent)

Wale – The Album About Nothing

 02. "The Helium Balloon" (additional producer credit; sample producer)

2016 
2 Chainz – ColleGrove
 08. "Bentley Truck" (featuring Lil Wayne)
6lack – Free 6lack
 01. "Never Know" (uncredited producer)
Ace Hood – Starvation 5
 06. "Go Mode" (featuring Rick Ross)
Bishop Nehru – Magic:19
 02. "It's Whateva" (sample producer; uncredited)
DJ Khaled – Major Key
 10. "Work For It" (featuring Big Sean, Gucci Mane & 2 Chainz)
Drake – Views
 15. "Pop Style"* (sample producer)
Common – Black America Again
 11. "A Bigger Picture Called Free" (featuring Syd & Bilal) (songwriter credit only; sample production)
 14. "Little Chicago Boy" (featuring Tasha Cobbs) (songwriter credit only; sample production)
Cousin Stizz – Monda
 11. "Big Fella" (sample producer; uncredited)
Cuz Lightyear – What Up Cuz

 04. "Recognize" (songwriter credit only)

Domo Genesis – Genesis
 "Awkward Groove" (songwriter credit only; sample producer)

Dvsn – Sept. 5th

 01. "With Me" (songwriter credit only)
Ella Mai – Change EP
 04. "Lay Up"* (sample producer; uncredited)
Fetty Wap – "Different Now" single
 01. "Different Now"*
Frank Ocean – Endless
 05. "U-N-I-T-Y" (songwriter credit only)
Genetikk – Fuck Genetikk

 07. "Mata Cobra"
 15. "Saint Laurant"

J. Cole – 4 Your Eyez Only
 02. "Immortal" (sample production)
James Vincent McMorrow – We Move
 02. "I Lie Awake Every Night"
Jarren Benton – Slow Motion Vol. 2
 04. "No F*cks to Give" (feat. Futuristic & Chris Webby) (sample producer; uncredited)
Kanye West – The Life of Pablo
 12. "Real Friends" (co-producer credit; sample production)
Kendrick Lamar – Untitled Unmastered
 07. "Untitled 07 | 2014 -2016"*
Kevin Hart – Kevin Hart: What Now?
 15. "What Now" (feat. BJ the Chicago Kid, Wale, and Chaz French) (sample producer; uncredited)
Lance Skiiiwalker – Introverted Intuition
 08. "Skit / Her Song"
Logic – Bobby Tarantino
 10. "Slave" (sample producer; uncredited)
Mac Miller – The Divine Feminine
 03. "Stay" (songwriter credit only)
 08. "We" (featuring CeeLo Green)*
 07. "Planet God Damn" (featuring Njomza)
Macklemore & Ryan Lewis – This Unruly Mess I've Made
 01. "Light Tunnels" (featuring Mike Slap) (music credit only)
Nekfeu – Cyborg
 06. "Esquimaux" (feat Népal) (sample producer; uncredited)
 07. "O.D." (feat. Murkage Dave) (sample producer; uncredited)
Nipsey Hussle – Slauson Boy 2
 05. "Full Time" (feat. Mitchy Slick) (sample producer; uncredited)
Post Malone – Stoney
 03. "Deja Vu" (featuring Justin Bieber)*
 05. "Cold"
 12. "Congratulations" (featuring Quavo)*
Pusha T – "Circles" single
 01. "Circles" (featuring Desiigner & Ty Dolla Sign)*
Rihanna – Anti (Deluxe)
 07. "Needed Me"* (co-producer credit; sample production)
 16. "Sex With Me"* (co-producer credit; sample production)
River Tiber – Indigo
 05. "West" (featuring Daniel Caesar) (songwriting credit only)
Ronny J – OMGRONNY
 03. "824" (songwriting credit only)
Schoolboy Q – Blank Face LP
 16. "Overtime" (featuring Miguel & Justine Skye)*
Snoh Aalegra – Don't Explain

 03. "Charleville 9200"

Taylor Gang – TGOD Volume 1

 19. "Trap Phone" (performed by Wiz Khalifa, Chevy Woods, Blunt Smoker)
The Game – 1992
 05. "The Juice" (sample producer; uncredited)
The Weeknd – Starboy
 13. "Attention"
Tory Lanez – I Told You
 06. "Friends With Benefits" (sample production)
Travis Scott – Birds in the Trap Sing McKnight
 11. "Pick Up The Phone" (featuring Young Thug & Quavo)*
 12. "Lose"
00. "Ooo Nana" (feat. Young Thug) demo (sample producer; uncredited)
Ty Dolla Sign – Campaign
 08. "Zaddy"*
Usher – Hard II Love
 08. "Make U a Believer"
Westside Boogie – Thirst 48 Pt. II

 11. "Slide on You" (songwriting credit only)

Young Thug – Jeffery

 10. "Pick Up the Phone" (with Travis Scott featuring Quavo)*

2017 
Amine – Good For You
 02. "Yellow" (featuring Nelly)
 05. "Spice Girl"*
 07. "Wedding Crashers" (featuring Offset)*
 08. "Sundays"
 14. "Beach Boy"
ASAP MOB – Cozy Tapes Vol. 2: Too Cozy
 11. "Frat Rules" (performed by ASAP Rocky, Playboi Carti and Big Sean) (sample producer; uncredited)
13. "Feels So Good" (performed by ASAP Rocky, ASAP Ferg, ASAP Nast, ASAP Twelvyy and ASAP Ant) (sample producer)
Bebe Rexha – All Your Fault: Pt. 2
 05. "Comfortable" (featuring Kranium)
Belly – Mumble Rap
 08. "Alcantara" (featuring Pusha T)
Big K.R.I.T. – 4eva Is a Mighty Long Time
 02–06. "Higher Calling" (featuring Jill Scott) (sample producer; songwriter credit only)
Bryson Tiller – True to Self
 09. "Always (Outro)" (songwriter credit only)
Cashmere Cat – 9
 08. "Trust Nobody" (featuring Selena Gomez & Tory Lanez)* (songwriter credit only)
Chris Brown – Heartbreak on a Full Moon
 2-05. "Tough Love"
Cousin Stizz – One Night Only
 11. "Jo Bros"
Denzel Curry – Imperial

 05. "Me Now"
Drake – More Life
 06. "Madiba Riddim"
 07. "Blem" (additional music contribution credit)
 20. "Fake Love"*
Fabolous & Trey Songz – Trappy New Years

 04. "Pick Up The Phone"

Frank Ocean – various singles
 00. "Chanel"*
 00. "Biking" (featuring Jay-Z & Tyler, The Creator)*
00. "Lens"
French Montana – Jungle Rules
 06. "Hotel Bathroom"
G-Dragon – Kwon Ji Yong
 05. "Divina Commedia"
G-Eazy & Carnage – Step Brothers EP

 02. "Gimme Gimme"

Huncho Jack – Huncho Jack, Jack Huncho
 04. "Motorcycle Patches"
Jahkoy – Foreign Water

 06. "Selfish" (co-producer credit)

Jeezy – Pressure

 10. "Like Them" (featuring Tory Lanez and Rick Ross) (co-producer credit)
 11. "The Life" (featuring Wizkid and Trey Songz) (co-producer credit)
Jhené Aiko – Trip
 11. "Never Call Me" (featuring Kurupt)
 17. "Mystic Journey (Freestyle)" (songwriter credit only)
JID – The Never Story
 07. "All Bad" (featuring Mereba) (sample producer; writing credit)
Jidenna – The Chief
 01. "A Bull's Tale"
 03. "Trampoline" (additional producer credit)
 08. "The Let Out" (featuring Nana Kwabena)* (co-producer credit)
 13. "White Niggas" (additional producer credit)
Joyner Lucas – 508-507-2209
 05. "Lullaby"
Kodak Black – Project Baby 2
 08. "Unexplainable"
12. "Built My Legacy" (uncredited)
Lido – Everything
 07. "Citi Bike" (songwriting credit only)
11. "Tell Me How To Feel"
Lil Pump – Lil Pump

14. "Flex Like Ouu"* (co-producer credit)

Lorde – Melodrama
 01. "Green Light"*
 03. "Homemade Dynamite"*
04. "The Louvre" (additional producer credit)
 06. "Hard Feelings/Loveless"
 07. "Sober II (Melodrama)"
 09. "Supercut" (additional producer credit)
 11. "Perfect Places"*
 12. "Homemade Dynamite (Remix) (featuring Khalid, Post Malone and SZA)" (Bonus Track)*
00. "Green Light (Chromeo Remix)"
Major Lazer – "Run Up" single

 "Run Up" (feat. PartyNextDoor & Nicki Minaj) (uncredited) (later included on 2018's Major Lazer Essentials)

Mod Sun – Movie

 01. "Previews"
 02. "We Do This Shit" (featuring Dej Loaf) (songwriter credit only)
NAV & Metro Boomin – Perfect Timing

 10. "Call Me" (uncredited)

Nicki Minaj – "Regret in Your Tears" single
 01. "Regret in Your Tears"*
PartyNextDoor – Seven Days
 03. "Damage" (with Halsey)*
Phora – Yours Truly Forever

 15. "In My Eyez" (songwriter credit only)
Romeo Santos – Golden
 16. "Imitadora"*
Smokepurpp – Deadstar
 08. "Fingers Blue" (featuring Travis Scott)
Starrah & Diplo – Starrah X Diplo EP

 04. "Always Come Back" (songwriter credit only)

SZA – Ctrl
 07. "Go Gina" (additional producer credit)
 09. "Broken Clocks"* (sample producer; songwriter credit only)
Various artists – The Fate of the Furious: The Album
 09. "911" (performed by Kevin Gates)
XXXTentacion – Members Only, Vol. 3

 14. "777" (with Kid Trunks)

ZAYN – Icarus Falls
 288. "Still Got Time" (featuring PartyNextDoor)*
Zoey Dollaz – M'ap Boule

 04. "Oh Yeah Yeah" (songwriter credit only)

2018 
50 Cent – "Crazy" single

 00. "Crazy" (feat. PnB Rock)
88rising – Head in the Clouds
 "Poolside Manor" (performed by Niki and August 8)

A.CHAL – EXOTIGAZ

 03. "DÉJALO"*

BIA – NICE GIRLS FINISH LAST: CUIDADO

 01. "Supabien" (songwriting credit only)

Bobby Feeno – Flamingo & Koval
 03. "I Still Love H.E.R."
Bobby Sessions – RVLTN (Chapter 1)
 09. "RVLTN" (feat. Zyah) (songwriting credit only)
Camila Cabello – Camila

Album executive producer
 01. "Never Be The Same"*
 02. "All These Years"
 03. "She Loves Control"
 04. "Havana" (featuring Young Thug)*
 05. "Inside Out"
 07. "Real Friends"
 08. "Something's Gotta Give"
 09. "In The Dark"
 10. "Into It"
 11. "Never Be The Same" (Radio Edit)
 12. "Havana" (remix) (with Daddy Yankee) (Bonus Track)
 13. "I Have Questions" (Japan Bonus Track) (additional production credit)
Cardi B – Invasion of Privacy
 05. "Be Careful"*
Charles Bradley – Black Velvet
 09. "Stay Away" (Nirvana cover; originally released by SPIN in 2011)
Dave East – Karma 2
 16. "Us" (feat. Gunna) (sample producer; uncredited)
David Guetta – 7

 07. "I'm That Bitch" (feat. Saweetie) (uncredited)
DJ SKIZZ – High Powered

 02. "Perfect Storm" (featuring Willie The Kid, Planet Asia, CRIMEAPPLE)

Future & Juice WRLD – WRLD ON DRUGS

 05. "Make It Back" (performed by Juice Wrld) (co-producer credit)
Juicy J – ShutDaFukUp
 05. "We Can't Smoke No Mo" (sample producer; uncredited)
Justine Skye – ULTRAVIOLET
 02. "Goodlove"
Lupe Fiasco – Drogas Wave

 03. "Manilla" (sample producer; uncredited)
Kodak Black – Heart Break Kodak
 01. "Running Outta Love"
Kirk Knight – liwii

 09. "Full Metal Jacket" (songwriter credit only)

Kris Wu – Antares
 01. "Antares"
 05. "We Alive"
Lil Baby & Gunna – Drip Harder
 10. "Style Stealer" (performed by Gunna)
Logic – Bobby Tarantino II
 07. "Midnight" (sample producer)
Masego – Lady Lady

 03. "Lavish Lullaby" (songwriter credit only)

Matty – Déjàvu

Album executive producer

 01. "Embarrassed"*
 02. "Verocai"
 03. "How Can He Be"
 04. "I'll Gladly Place Myself Below You"*
 05. "Clear"
 06. "Polished"
 07. "Nothing, Yet"
 08. "Butter"
 09. "Déjávu"
 10. "Verocai Pt. II" (Bonus Track)
Meek Mill – Championships
 19. "Cole Hearted II" (sample producer)
MØ – Forever Neverland
 01. "Intro"
 14. "Purple Like the Summer Rain"
Nicki Minaj – Queen
 14. "2 Lit 2 Late Interlude"
District 21 – No Static

 12. "Calabasas High"

Post Malone – Beerbongs & Bentleys
 02. "Spoil My Night" (featuring Swae Lee)
 03. "Rich & Sad"
 09. "Better Now"*
Rae Sremmurd – SR3MM
 3-07. "Keep God First" (performed by Slim Jxmmi) (sample producer)
3-09. "Growed Up" (performed by Slim Jxmmi) (sample producer)
Rich the Kid – The World Is Yours 2
 03. "Splashin"* (sample producer)
Royce da 5'9" – Book of Ryan
 19. "Stay Woke" (featuring Ashley Sorrell)
Ryan Beatty – Boy in Jeans

 14. "Rhinestone"

Smokepurpp – "Big Bucks" single

 00. "Big Bucks" (songwriter credit only)

The Neighbourhood – The Neighbourhood
 03. "Nervous" (songwriter credit only)
The Weeknd – My Dear Melancholy

EP executive producer
 01. "Call Out My Name"*
 02. "Try Me"
 03. "Wasted Times"
 04. "I Was Never There" (featuring Gesaffelstein)
 06. "Privilege"
 07. "Call Out My Name – A Capella version" (Bonus Track)
Travis Scott – Astroworld
 08. "Wake Up"*
 11. "Astrothunder"
 14. "Who? What?" (songwriter credit only; sample production)
Various artists – Black Panther: The Album
 12. "Seasons" (performed by Mozzy featuring Sjava & Reason)
 14. "Pray For Me" (performed by The Weeknd & Kendrick Lamar)*
Wiley – Godfather II

 08. "Fashion Week" (sample producer; uncredited)

Wiz Khalifa – Rolling Papers II

 07. "Rolling Papers II"

2019 
BEAM – 95

 10. "Stranded"

Camila Cabello – Romance
 03. "Should've Said It"
 07. "Easy"*
 08. "Feel It Twice"
 10. "Cry for Me"*
 14. "My Oh My" (featuring DaBaby) (Bonus Track)*
Chris Brown – Indigo
 09. "Need a Stack" (featuring Lil Wayne and Joyner Lucas)
Curren$y – Back at Burnie's (2019)
 02. "All Work" (feat. Young Dolph) (sample producer; uncredited)
DJ Khaled – Father of Ashad
 06. "Celebrate" (featuring Travis Scott and Post Malone)
Doug Shorts – Casual Encounter EP

Album producer with Homer Steinweiss

 01. Get With The Program
 02. Casual Encounter
 03. Heads or Tails
 04. Money
 05. Keep Your Head Up
 06. This Feeling I Get
Drake – Care Package
 07. "4PM in Calabasas"
Flipp Dinero – Love for Guala
 13. "Till I'm Gone" (feat. Kodak Black)
Freddie Gibbs & Madlib – Bandana
 03. "Half Manne Half Cocaine" (sample producer)
IDK – Is He Real
 06. "Lilly" (sample producer)
Jaden – ERYS (Deluxe)
 14. "Beautiful Disruption"
Jonas Brothers – Happiness Begins
 01. "Sucker"* (co-producer credit)
Juice Wrld – Death Race for Love
 05. "Fast"*
Julia Michaels –Inner Monologue Part 1 EP
 02. "Into You"
Kevin Garrett – Hoax

 01. "Warn" (songwriter credit only)

Lil' Kim – 9 (2019)
 03. "Catch My Wave" (feat. Rich the Kid) (sample producer; uncredited)
Logic – Confessions of a Dangerous Mind
 05. "Mama / Show Love" (featuring Cordae) (sample producer)
Melii – phAses

 14. "Feel Me" (songwriter credit only)

MorMor – Some Place Else

 02. "Outside"*

Pardison Fontaone – Underb8d
 02. "Too Late" (feat. Jadakiss)
PnB Rock – TrapStar Turnt PopStar (Deluxe Edition)
 03–04. "Take My Soul" (featuring YoungBoy Never Broke Again)
Post Malone – Hollywood's Bleeding
 02. "Saint-Tropez"
 05. "A Thousand Bad Times"
 06. "Circles"*
 11. "Staring at the Sun" (featuring SZA)
 15. "Myself"
 17. "Wow"*
00. "Wow." (Remix) (feat. Roddy Ricch & Tyga)
00. "Wow." (Instrumental)
Rayland Baxster – Good Mmornin

 04. "We" (songwriter credit only)

Rich Brian – The Sailor

 04. "Kids"*
Rosalía – "A Palé" single
 01. "A Palé"
Rosalía, J Balvin, El Guincho – "Con Altura" single

 01. "Con Altura"*

Rosalía & Ozuna – "Yo X Ti Tu X Mi" single

 01. "Yo X Ti, Tu X Mi"*
Stormzy – Heavy is the Head
 06. "Handsome"
Taylor Swift – Lover
 01. "I Forgot That You Existed"
 15. "Afterglow"
 17. "It's Nice to Have a Friend"
 00. "All of the Girls You Loved Before"
Trippie Red – !

 08. "Keep You Head Up"
WYNNE – If I May...

 03. "Playa"

Young M.A. – Herstory in the Making

 16. "Foreign"

2020 
Anna Sofia – Self Aware Bitch

 01. "Self Aware Bitch"
Calvin Harris & The Weeknd – "Over Now" single
 00. "Over Now"*
Don Toliver – Heaven or Hell
 03. "Cardigan"
 08. "Company"
 10. "Spaceship" (feat. Sheck Wes)
G-Eazy – The Beautiful & Damned (Deluxe Edition)

 22. "Love You Like You Do" (feat. Rittybo & Jammy) (sample producer)
Gunna – Wunna
 "Skybox"* (songwriter credit only)
Justin Bieber – Changes

 11. "Get Me" (feat. Kehlani)

Kaan Güneşberk – "The Realist" single
 01. "The Realist"
Kodak Black – "Because of You" single
 01. "Because of You"*
Logic – No Pressure
 03. "GP4" (sample producer; credited as writer)
Mez – "Loading..." single

 00. "Loading..." (2020)

PARTYNEXTDOOR – PARTYPACK EP

 03. "Things & Such" (songwriter credit only)

Rosalía – various singles
 00. "Dolerme"*
 00. "Como Alí"*
Savannah Ré – Opia

 05. "Love Me Back"

Shawn Mendes –Wonder
 01. "Intro"
 08. "Song for No One"
 09. "Monster" (feat. Justin Bieber)*
$Not – - Tragedy +

 07. "Mistake (Choppa Boy)"
Tierra Wack – "Dora" single
 00. "Dora"*
The Weeknd – After Hours
 01. "Alone Again"
Various artists – Road to Fast 9 Mixtape
 03. "Clap" (performed by Don Toliver feat. Sheck Wes)

2021 
347aidan – "IDWK" single

 01. "IDWK" (feat. Kenny Beats)*
Menahan Street Band – The Exciting Sounds Of The Menahan Street Band

 11. "The Duke" (songwriting credit only)*
J. Cole – The Off-Season

 08. "Let Go My Hand" (feat. Bas and 6lack)

Mustafa – When Smoke Rises

 01. "Stay Alive"*
02. "Air Forces"*
03. "Separate"
04. "The Hearse"*
05. "Capo" (feat. Sampha) (music credit only)
06. "Ali"*
07. "What About Heaven"
08. "Come Back"
Logic – "Get Up" single

 00. "Get Up"* (songwriting credit only)
Russ – "On The Way" single

 00. "One the Way"* (songwriting credit only)

Dvsn & Ty Dolla Sign – Cheers to the Best Memories

 09. "Better Yet (dvsn Interlude)"
Baby Keem – The Melodic Blue

 01. "Trademark USA"

Shad – Tao

 09. "Tao Pt 2"

James Blake – Friends That Break Your Heart
 07. "Foot Forward"
Mac Miller – Faces (Re-Release)

 25. "Yeah"
French Montana – They Got Amnesia

 10. "Didn't Get Far" (feat. Fabolous) (songwriting credit only)

$not – Ethereal

 13. "High IQ" (songwriting credit only)

2022 

Rosalía – Motomami

 02. "Candy"
 03. "La Fama" (with The Weeknd)*
 10. "Diablo"
 13. "Como un G"
Mnnyyz – "For The Low" single

 00. "For The Low"

Koffee – Gifted

 04. "Gifted"
Romeo Santos – Formula, Vol. 3

 04. "Boomerang" (songwriting credit only)

Cilo – LOS

 01. "Pray I Make It Home"
 02. "Don't B Bitter / 101"

References 

Discographies of Canadian artists
Production discographies
Hip hop discographies
Songs written by Frank Dukes
Song recordings produced by Frank Dukes